Teuntje Beekhuis (born 18 August 1995) is a Dutch professional racing cyclist, who currently rides for UCI Women's Continental Team .

Career
Beekhuis became a professional cyclist in 2018 after winning a talent day organized by the  team. She signed to ride for the UCI Women's Team  for the 2019 women's road cycling season. Beekhuis showed to be a good climber during her first full season as a professional, with a 7th place in the second stage of the Vuelta a Burgos Feminas as her best result. At the end of 2019, Beekhuis was announced to join  for the 2020 women's road cycling season. For Lotto Soudal she completed the Giro Rosa finishing 65th place in the general classification. Her best result in 2020 was a 13th position in Omloop van het Hageland.

In October 2020, it was announced that Beekhuis had signed to become a member of the 12-rider  roster for its first season in 2021.

Major results

2021
 8th Overall Healthy Ageing Tour

References

External links
 

1995 births
Living people
Dutch female cyclists
Place of birth missing (living people)
People from Geldrop
Cyclists from North Brabant
21st-century Dutch women